The Kottonmouth Kings is an American hip hop group formed in Placentia, California in 1996 by D-Loc and Saint Dog. The group advocates for legalizing cannabis, and their lyrics frequently refer to smoking marijuana. The group plays hip hop, punk and rap rock songs that sometimes incorporate elements of other genres, including psychedelic rock, reggae, dubstep, bluegrass and jam band.

History

Royal Highness (1998–1999) 
On February 24, 1998, Kottonmouth Kings released their first overall album, and their first EP, Stoners Reeking Havoc.

On August 11, 1998, Kottonmouth Kings released their first national album, first studio album, and second overall album titled Royal Highness on Suburban Noize Records and Capitol Records. The album featured the original lineup of Daddy X, D-Loc, Saint Dog on vocals, and Lou Dog on drums and percussion, and DJ Bobby B.

On March 11, 1999, Kottonmouth Kings released their second EP, and third overall album, Stash Box. On October 26, 1999, Kottonmouth Kings released their first compilation album, Hidden Stash. This was also the last album to feature Saint Dog as a member of Kottonmouth Kings.

High Society (2000) 
Kottonmouth Kings began to gain mainstream success with the release of their third studio album, and their fifth overall album, High Society on June 27, 2000. This was the first album to feature "original" member Johnny Richter. The album charted at #65 on the Billboard 200.

Hidden Stash II: The Kream of the Krop (2001) 
On September 4, 2001 D-Loc released his first solo album and his first under the name DJ Shakey Bonez titled The Green Room.

Kottonmouth Kings toured with D12/Primer 55 and Bionic Jive during the fall of 2001 in support of their fourth studio album, and sixth overall album, Hidden Stash II: The Kream of the Krop which was released on October 9, 2001. The album charted at #100 on the Billboard 200.

Rollin' Stoned (2002–2003) 
On October 8, 2002, Kottonmouth Kings released their fourth studio album, and their seventh overall album titled Rollin' Stoned. The album charted at #51 on the Billboard 200.

In 2003 Kottonmouth Kings released their second compilation album, and their eighth overall release with the promo CD titled Green Is Gold.

On July 22, 2003 Tsunami Bros released their debut album titled King Harbor.

On August 12, 2003, Kottonmouth Kings released their third compilation album, their first live album and their ninth overall album titled Classic Hits Live.

Fire It Up (2004) 
On April 20, 2004, Kottonmouth Kings released their fifth studio album, and their tenth overall release titled Fire It Up. The album charted at #42 on the Billboard 200.

On August 24, 2004, Daddy X released Organic Soul, his first solo album, and Kingspade released their debut album titled Kingspade.

On November 16, 2004, Kottonmouth Kings released their fourth compilation album, and their eleventh overall album, The Kottonmouth Xperience.

Kottonmouth Kings (2005) 
On May 31, 2005, Kottonmouth Kings released their sixth studio album, and their twelfth overall album titled Kottonmouth Kings. The album charted at #50 on the Billboard 200.

On November 15, 2005, Kottonmouth Kings released their fifth compilation album and their thirteenth overall album, Joint Venture. The album charted at #193 on the Billboard 200.

Koast II Koast (2006) 
On January 31, 2006 Daddy X released his second solo album titled Family Ties.

On May 9, 2006, Kottonmouth Kings released their third EP, and fourteenth overall album titled Nickel Bag. The album was a prelude to Koast II Koast, their seventh studio album, released June 6. Koast II Koast charted at #39 on the Billboard 200.

In 2006, Kottonmouth Kings headlined at the annual Cannabis Cup, and was named "Band of the Year" by High Times.

On November 21, 2006, Kottonmouth Kings released their sixth compilation album and their sixteenth overall album, Hidden Stash III. The album charted at #199 on the Billboard 200.

Cloud Nine (2007) 
On April 24, 2007 Kingspade released their second album, P.T.B..

On August 28, 2007, Kottonmouth Kings released their eighth studio album and their seventeenth overall album, Cloud Nine. The album charted at #44 on the Billboard 200.

The Green Album (2008–2009) 
On January 15, 2008, Kottonmouth Kings released their seventh compilation album, and their eighteenth overall album, Greatest Highs. The album charted at #168 on the Billboard 200.

On April 15, 2008, Kottonmouth Kings released their eighth compilation album and their nineteenth overall album, The Kottonmouth Xperience Vol. II: Kosmic Therapy.

On October 28, 2008, Kottonmouth Kings released their ninth studio album and their twentieth overall album, The Green Album. The album charted at #42 on the Billboard 200.

In 2009, D-Loc released his second solo album and his second under the name DJ Shakey Bonez titled Kingspade Presents D-Loc's DJ Shakey Bonez: Dog Treats.

On October 13, 2009, Kottonmouth Kings released their tenth compilation album and their twenty-third overall album titled Hidden Stash 420. The album charted at #103 on the Billboard 200.

Long Live the Kings (2010) 
On April 20, 2010, Kottonmouth Kings released their tenth studio album, Long Live the Kings. The album charted at #26 on the Billboard 200. Ironically named, the album was the last time Pakelika would be on as he was kicked out of the group by Daddy X, and died some time later.

On July 6, 2010 Johnny Richter released his debut solo album, Laughing.

On August 17, 2010 D-Loc released his third solo album and the first under the name D-Loc titled MFK (Made for Kings).

Sunrise Sessions (2011) 
On March 1, 2011 The Dirtball released his fifth solo album, fourth on Suburban Noize Records, and first since joining Kottonmouth Kings, titled Nervous System.

On April 19, 2011, Kottonmouth Kings released their fifth EP and their twenty-fifth overall album, Legalize It.

On July 19, 2011, Kottonmouth Kings released their eleventh studio album, Sunrise Sessions. The album charted at #46 on the Billboard 200.

On November 8, 2011, Kottonmouth Kings released their eleventh compilation album, Hidden Stash 5: Bongloads & B-Sides.

Mile High (2012–2013) 
On March 20, 2012 D-Loc released his fourth solo album and the second under the name D-Loc, an EP titled Weedman.

On May 22, 2012 The Dirtball released his sixth solo album, fifth on Suburban Noize Records, and second since joining Kottonmouth Kings, an EP titled Desert Eagle.

On August 14, 2012, Kottonmouth Kings released their twelfth studio album and their twenty-eighth overall album, Mile High. The album charted at #36 on the Billboard 200.

On December 25, 2013, D-Loc released his fifth solo album and the third under the name D-Loc, a second EP titled Bong Tokes & Love Notes.

Independent (2013–2014) 
In March 2013 it was announced via social media accounts that Kottonmouth Kings had left Suburban Noize Records. Daddy X filed for the copyright of the name United Family Music.

In October 2013, Johnny Richter announced via Twitter that he was leaving Kottonmouth Kings, and was unsure if he would continue to do music. He released his first post-Kottonmouth Kings solo album, an EP titled FreeKing Out on December 17, 2013. However, he is still currently signed with Subnoize Records as a solo artist.

The Buddah Shack EP (2014) 
On April 20, 2014, Kottonmouth Kings released their first post-Johnny Richter album, their sixth EP titled The Buddah Shack.

In September 2014, the band announced on Twitter and Facebook that their new album, Krown Power, was in the final stages of being mixed and was set to be released in early 2015. On December 31, 2014, Kottonmouth Kings officially announced via their Twitter account that the album, the first LP release on United Family Music, would be dropping on April 21, 2015.

Krown Power (2015–2016) 
In early April 2015, KMK announced that the new tentative release date for Krown Power was set for June 2015, and that the album would be available for pre-order on April 20, 2015. A single and the accompanying video would be released each month leading up to the release of the album; the debut single/music video was "Ganja Glow".

In August 2015, DJ Bobby B announced on Instagram that he and the band had parted ways after working together for nineteen years.

On August 28, 2015, Krown Power, Kottonmouth Kings' thirteenth studio album was released. In November 2015, it was announced that KMK was set to release a new album in 2016 titled Ganja Farm with Marlon Asher and original KMK member Saint Dog.

Hiatus (2016–2017) 
After the 20th anniversary tour and the tour to promote Krown Power, the group quietly went on hiatus with no announcement. On July 31, 2017, D-Loc announced that the Kottonmouth Kings may still perform as a group at certain shows in the future.

Reunion and 25 to Life (2017–2021) 
It was announced in December 2017, that D-Loc and Richter had reunited to reform Kingspade. In January 2018 Daddy X sent out a newsletter via United Family Music hinting at KMK returning in 2018. On January 31, 2018, Kingspade announced via Instagram that new music was set to be released on March 1, 2018, through the Kingmaker Company. On March 1, 2018, a music video for the Kingspade song "Who We" was released. In the video it was announced that Kingspade would release a full-length album in the summer of 2018 and Kottonmouth Kings would be releasing a new album titled Kingdom Come on April 20, 2018. Kottonmouth Kings came back in 2018 when original founding members D-Loc and Saint Dog, along with Johnny Richter on multiple features, released the album Kingdom Come. The current lineup features D-Loc, Richter, and DJ Product 1969. On October 13, 2020, Saint Dog died. On December 5, 2020, D-Loc announced that he had formed P.T.B. Records and that a new Kottonmouth Kings album, titled 25 to Life, was set to be released in 2021. The album was released on April 20, 2021.

Discography 

Royal Highness (1998)
High Society (2000)
Hidden Stash II: The Kream of the Krop (2001)
Rollin' Stoned (2002)
Fire It Up (2004)
Kottonmouth Kings (2005)
Koast II Koast (2006)
Cloud Nine (2007)
The Green Album (2008)
Long Live The Kings (2010)
Sunrise Sessions (2011)
Mile High (2012)
Krown Power (2015)
Kingdom Come (2018)
25 to Life (2021)

Solo albums 
The Green Room (2001) (DJ Shakey Bonez) (Suburban Noize Records)
Organic Soul (2004) (Daddy X) (Suburban Noize Records)
Family Ties (2006) (Daddy X) (Suburban Noize Records)
Kingspade Presents D-Loc's DJ Shakey Bonez: Dog Treats (2009) (DJ Shakey Bonez) (Suburban Noize Records)
Laughing (2010) (Johnny Richter) (Suburban Noize Records)
MFK (Made for Kings) (2010) (D-Loc) (Suburban Noize Records)
Nervous System (2011) (The Dirtball) (Suburban Noize Records)
Weedman EP (2012) (D-Loc) (Suburban Noize Records)
Desert Eagle EP (2012) (The Dirtball) (Suburban Noize Records)
Bong Tokes & Love Notes EP (2013) (D-Loc) (Suburban Noize Records)
Skull Hollow (2018) (The Dirtball) (Throttle House)
The Harvest (2018) (D-Loc) (Kingmaker Music)
Ripperside (2018) (D-Loc) (Kingmaker Music)
Bozo (2019) (Saint Dog) (Suburban Noize Records)

Filmography

References

External links

1996 establishments in California
American cannabis activists
Cannabis music
Hip hop groups from California
Musical groups established in 1996
Musical groups from Orange County, California
Punk rock groups from California
Suburban Noize Records artists
Rap rock groups